The women's hammer throw event at the 2019 African Games was held on 27 August in Rabat.

Results

References

Hammer